The 2017 OFC Champions League was the 16th edition of the Oceanian Club Championship, Oceania's premier club football tournament organized by the Oceania Football Confederation (OFC), and the 11th season under the current OFC Champions League name.

In the final, Auckland City defeated Team Wellington 5–0 on aggregate and won the OFC Champions League seven years in a row and nine times in total, and qualified as the OFC representative at the 2017 FIFA Club World Cup in the United Arab Emirates.

Format change
The OFC decided to expand the tournament and change the format for the 2017 edition:
The competition consisted of four stages: qualifying stage, group stage, semi-finals, and final.
For the qualifying stage, like in the previous season, four teams took part in this stage, which included one team each from the four developing associations. The stage was played in round-robin format at a single venue, with the winners and runners-up advancing to the group stage (instead of only the group winners).
For the group stage, 16 teams took part in this stage (increased from 12 teams), which included two teams each from the seven developed associations, plus the qualifying stage winners and runners-up. They were drawn into four groups of four teams (increased from three groups), where each group was played in round-robin format at a different venue (instead of all groups played at a single venue), with the group winners advancing to the semi-finals.
For the semi-finals, the four teams were drawn into two ties, which were played in home-and-away format over two legs (instead of a single match).
For the final, the tie was played in home-and-away format over two legs (instead of a single match).

Teams

A total of 18 teams from all 11 OFC member associations entered the competition.
The seven developed associations (Fiji, New Caledonia, New Zealand, Papua New Guinea, Solomon Islands, Tahiti, Vanuatu) were awarded two berths each in the group stage.
The four developing associations (American Samoa, Cook Islands, Samoa, Tonga) were awarded one berth each in the qualifying stage, with the winners and runners-up advancing to the group stage.

Notes

Schedule
The schedule of the competition was as follows.

Draw
The draw of the qualifying stage and group stage was held on 24 August 2016, 12:30 NZST (UTC+12), at the OFC Headquarters in Auckland, New Zealand.

For the qualifying stage, the four teams were drawn into each of the four positions 1–4 to determine the fixtures.

For the group stage, the 16 teams (14 teams entering the group stage and two teams advancing from the qualifying stage) were drawn into four groups of four, with each group containing one team from each of the four pots 1–4, which also represented the positions in each group to determine the fixtures. Teams from the same association could not be drawn into the same group. The teams were seeded based on the following:
The teams seeded 1–11 were based on the team results of the 2016 OFC Champions League.
The teams seeded 12–14 were based on the association results of the 2016 OFC Champions League.
The teams seeded 15–16 were the qualifying stage winners and runners-up respectively, whose identity were not known at the time of the draw.

Notes

Qualifying stage
In the qualifying stage, the four teams played each other on a round-robin basis. The winners and runners-up advanced to the group stage to join the 14 direct entrants.

Matches were played between 28 January – 3 February 2017 in Nukuʻalofa, Tonga. All times were local, TOT (UTC+13).

Group stage
In the group stage, the four teams in each group played each other on a round-robin basis. The four group winners advanced to the semi-finals.

The hosts of each group were announced on 10 October 2016. The schedule was confirmed on 17 January 2017.

Group A
Matches were played between 25 February – 3 March 2017 in Nouméa, New Caledonia. All times were local, NCT (UTC+11).

Group B
Matches were played between 26 February – 4 March 2017 in Koné, New Caledonia. All times were local, NCT (UTC+11).

Group C
Matches were played between 11–18 March 2017 in Auckland, New Zealand. All times were local, NZDT (UTC+13).

Group D
Matches were played between 11–17 March 2017 in Pirae, Tahiti. All times were local, TAHT (UTC−10).
<onyinclude></onlyinclude>

Knockout stage
In the knockout stage, the four teams played on a single-elimination basis, with each tie played on a home-and-away two-legged basis. If tied on aggregate, away goals were the first tie-breaker.

The draw for the knockout stage was held on 20 March 2017, 11:30 NZDT (UTC+13), at the OFC Headquarters in Auckland, New Zealand, to decide the matchups and the order of legs of the semi-finals, and the order of legs of the final.

Bracket

Semi-finals
Matches were played on 8 and 16 April 2017.

|-

|}

Auckland City won 4–0 on aggregate.

Team Wellington won 9–3 on aggregate.

Final

Matches were played on the 30 April and 7 May 2017.

Auckland City won 5–0 on aggregate.

Top goalscorers

Awards
The following awards were given at the conclusion of the tournament.

See also
2017 FIFA Club World Cup

References

External links
2017 OFC Champions League, oceaniafootball.com
Qualifying stage results
Competition proper results

 
2017
1